I'm a Celebrity...Get Me Out of Here! returned for its thirteenth series on 17 November 2013 on ITV, and ended on 8 December 2013.

The show was confirmed to be returning to ITV at the end of the previous series. On 21 October 2013, two teasers were revealed for the new series, which were broadcast on air across the ITV network in the run up to the series' premiere.

Ant & Dec both returned as presenters of the show, whilst Joe Swash, Laura Whitmore and Rob Beckett returned to present the ITV2 spin-off show, I'm a Celebrity...Get Me Out of Here Now!. The final three were Kian Egan, who won, David Emanuel in second place and Lucy Pargeter in third place. With this victory, Kian Egan became the first celebrity born outside the United Kingdom to win the series, since Gino D'Acampo in 2009.

Celebrities
The celebrity cast line-up for the thirteenth series was confirmed on 13 November 2013. On 21 November 2013, it was revealed that Annabel Giles and Vincent Simone would be the final two celebrities to enter the jungle.

Results and elimination
 Indicates that the celebrity was immune from the vote
 Indicates that the celebrity received the most votes from the public
 Indicates that the celebrity received the fewest votes and was eliminated immediately (no bottom two)
 Indicates that the celebrity was named as being in the bottom two
 Indicates that the celebrity received the second fewest votes and were not named in the bottom two

Notes
N.B. Bottom two is not a strict indication of the public vote as the celebrities are revealed in no particular order.
 The public were voting for who they wanted to become a camp saviour rather than who they wanted to save.
 Joey and Kian were exempt from this vote because they were already in 'Camp Saviour'.
 In order to win the final immunity token the eight celebrities who were not immune took part in a Bushtucker Trial called "Critter Crates". The first person to unlock all five padlocks by moving keys through a maze using a magnet would be given immunity, while the other seven faced the public vote. 
 The public were voting for who they wanted to win, rather than to save.

Bushtucker trials
The contestants take part in daily trials to earn food. These trials aim to test both physical and mental abilities. The winner is usually determined by the number of stars collected during the trial, with each star representing a meal earned by the winning contestant for their camp mates.

 The public voted for who they wanted to face the trial
 The contestants decided who did which trial
 The trial was compulsory and neither the public or celebrities decided who took part

Notes
 The celebrities were split up into two teams, Yellow (Lucy, Alfonso, Kian, Matthew and David) and Red (Steve, Joey, Rebecca, Amy and Laila). The Yellow team won meaning they moved into 'Croc Creek', the more luxurious of the two camps in the jungle. While the Reds, who lost the trial, moved into 'Snake Rock'.
 These trials both went to a tie breaker, resulting in Joey winning. 
 Rebecca was excluded from this trial on medical grounds.
 Matthew and David were excluded from this trial on medical grounds.
 Joey had to pick someone to help him for parts of the trial; he chose Alfonso.
 Rebecca and Laila are excluded from this trial on medical grounds.
 Only 9 stars were on offer due to three of the celebrities (Kian, Steve and Laila) winning the 'Halfway Holiday' challenge and not being present in the camp that evening.
 Only 10 stars were on offer due to Kian & Joey being away on their 'Camp Saviour' challenge and not being present in camp that evening.
 Only 9 stars were on offer due to Kian, Joey and Amy being away on their 'Camp Saviour' challenge and not being present in camp that evening.
 As well as deciding who would win the final immunity token, it also decided how many meals the camp would get. Each celebrity was playing for 1  stars, but as only Matthew (who won) and Alfonso managed to escape their crates within the time the group only won 3 meals for camp.

Star count

Dingo Dollar challenges
Two members from camp will take part in the challenge to win the 'Dingo Dollars'. If they win them then they can then take the dollars to the 'Outback Shack', where they can exchange them for camp luxuries with Kiosk Keith. Two options are given and the celebrities can choose which they would like to win. However, to win their luxury, a question is asked to the celebrities still in camp via the telephone box. If the question is answered correctly, the celebrities can take the items back to camp. If wrong, they receive nothing.

 The celebrities got the question correct
 The celebrities got the question wrong

Halfway Holiday/Roach Trip Challenge
A new feature for I'm A Celebrity allowed three celebrities to have the opportunity of escaping the jungle for a one night chance of luxury. Shortly after the arrival of Annabel and Vincent in the camp, the celebrities were told to get into four groups of three in order to complete the next challenge set for them. Each celebrity picked a stick. If their stick had a coloured tip, it meant they were team captains. The captains were Steve, David, Amy and Vincent. Each team had to wear Hawaiian type shirts indicating their team colour (blue, pink, purple or orange). The winners would get to spend a night of luxury while the remaining nine celebrities got on a bus with various creatures, including rats, snakes, cockroaches etc.

The teams were as follows:

Team Blue: Steve, Kian and Laila
Team Purple: David, Matthew and Rebecca
Team Orange: Amy, Joey and Annabel
Team Pink: Vincent, Alfonso and Lucy

Challenges
Bold indicates that the team won the challenge

Steve, Laila and Kian left the trial to spend their night in luxury whilst the remaining 9 losing celebrities spent a night on 'The Roach Trip'. The winners jetted off to a beautiful holiday resort outside the jungle. On the second day of the holiday, the crew unexpectedly got a reunion off of their loved ones each. Kian was met with his wife Jodi, Steve met his wife Jeannie and Laila was reunited with her sister Jacqueline. When they returned, Steve, Kian and Laila each had three messages each to deliver to the celebrities. It was from their loved ones and it left the camp very emotional.

Episodes

Ratings
Official ratings are taken from BARB. There were no shows on the 19 and 26 November due to live football being shown, but Get Me Out of Here! NOW! still aired as normal. The first episode of the series achieved the highest ever rating for an opening I'm a Celebrity episode.

References

External links
 

Episode list using the default LineColor
2013 in British television
2013 British television seasons
13